The 2001 Open 13 was a tennis tournament played on indoor hard courts at the Palais des Sports de Marseille in Marseille in France and was part of the International Series of the 2001 ATP Tour. The tournament ran from February 12 through February 19, 2001.

Finals

Singles

 Yevgeny Kafelnikov defeated  Sébastien Grosjean 7–6(7–5), 6–2
 It was Kafelnikov's 1st title of the year and the 44th of his career.

Doubles

 Julien Boutter /  Fabrice Santoro defeated  Michael Hill /  Jeff Tarango 7–6(9–7), 7–5
 It was Boutter's 1st title of the year and the 3rd of his career. It was Santoro's only title of the year and the 11th of his career.

References

External links
 Official website 
 ATP tournament profile
 ITF tournament edition details

Open 13
Open 13
Open 13